Actias keralana is a species of moth of the family Saturniidae described by Wolfgang A. Nässig, Stefan Naumann and Alessandro Giusti in 2020. It is native to southern India.

References 

keralana
Moths described in 2020
Moths of Asia